Wilfred Adey (6 July 1909 – 1975) was a footballer who played in The Football League for Barnsley, Carlisle United and Sheffield United, He also played for Scottish club Aberdeen for two seasons before the Second World War.

References

External links
Famous Football Teams in Training No. 5 - Barnsley: Video newsreel film including footage of Wilfred Adey British Pathé

English footballers
Aberdeen F.C. players
Barnsley F.C. players
Carlisle United F.C. players
Sheffield United F.C. players
English Football League players
Scottish Football League players
1909 births
1975 deaths
Association football defenders
Sportspeople from Featherstone
Huddersfield Town A.F.C. players